Joseph Omer Boudreau (October 16, 1916 – 1981) was a Canadian politician. He served in the Legislative Assembly of New Brunswick from 1963 to 1974 as member of the Liberal party.

References

1916 births
1981 deaths